Gilles Saint-Paul (born 8 February 1963) is a French economist at Paris School of Economics. He also is a scientific advisor to the Economic Studies Directorate at the French Ministry of the Environment. His main interests include the political economy of unemployment and how information technology affects wage inequality.

Career
After receiving engineering degrees from the Ecole Polytechnique in 1985 and the Ecole des Ponts et Chaussées in 1987, Saint-Paul graduated with a master's degree in applied mathematics from Paris-Dauphine University. Saint-Paul earned his Ph.D. in economics in 1990 at the Massachusetts Institute of Technology, advised by Olivier Blanchard and Michael Piore.

He taught economics at ENSAE ParisTech from 1990 to 1997 and at Pompeu Fabra University from 1997 to 2000. He is a professor at Paris School of Economics since 2006. He also holds the title of Global Professor of Economics at NYU Abu Dhabi.

Work
He has published four books and authored numerous articles in the top journals including a number path breaking contributions on the political economy of labour market reform. He is a CEPR Research Fellow and has been Director of the CEPR Labour Economics Programme since 2001.

Awards
He received the Yrjö Jahnsson Award awarded by the European Economic Association in 2007.

References

External links
  Gilles Saint-Paul's personal website

1963 births
Living people
20th-century  French  economists
21st-century  French economists
MIT School of Humanities, Arts, and Social Sciences alumni
École Polytechnique alumni
Academic staff of Pompeu Fabra University
Academic staff of the Toulouse School of Economics
Academic staff of the Paris School of Economics
Academic staff of New York University Abu Dhabi
Academic staff of the École Normale Supérieure
Corps des ponts
Labor economists